Sextet is the third album by English band A Certain Ratio, released in 1982 by record label Factory. It is the first album by the band not to be produced by Martin Hannett.

The album spent eleven weeks in the UK Independent Chart, peaking at number 1.

Critical reception 

The album generally received critical acclaim. Writing in Smash Hits on the album's release in January 1982, Dave Rimmer noted that the album featured "dense and gloomy pieces", suitable for "the bleak mid-winter". He gave the album an overall 6 out of 10.The Quietus called it "a visionary musical statement" and "arguably their greatest moment [...] Not since PIL's dominant 'Metal Box' had a band so seamlessly traversed such an unexpectedly broad musical landscape." Stylus called the album "a masterpiece [...] a mesmerizing blend of ethnic rhythms and ghostly production that really sounds like nothing else." Douglas Wolk of Pitchfork thought that the album "still sounds like no other record: either that era's creepiest, boggiest dance album or its funkiest smear of brittle art-noise." Uncut magazine praised the record for its "taut, abrasive swagger," as well as its blend of funk and world music influences. Exclaim! critic Kevin Hainey described it as "a strong ACR album from start to finish", and wrote that Tilson's vocals "give the band a somewhat airier, more soulful feel, and the added attention to African rhythms only slightly relieves their trademark tension."

Nevertheless, Trouser Press gave an unfavourable review to the album, writing: "There's no real focus to the discoid beats and wailing female vocals (Martha Tilson); ACR don't seem especially motivated by the music they're making." AllMusic critic Keith Farley thought that the record "upped the energy of A Certain Ratio's dour minimalist dance." Farley also stated "the electronics and rhythms are still curiously apart from song structure for the most part, making for an oddly distanced record."

Track listing
All tracks composed by A Certain Ratio
 "Lucinda" – 3:56
 "Crystal" – 2:55
 "Gum" – 2:59
 "Knife Slits Water" – 7:34
 "Skipscada" – 2:10
 "Day One" – 6:12
 "Rub Down" – 3:43
 "Rialto" – 3:45
 "Below the Canal" – 3:59

Personnel
Album personnel as adapted from album liner notes.

Musicians
 Donald Johnson
 Jeremy Kerr
 Martha Tilson
 Martin Moscrop
 Peter Terrell
 Simon Topping

Other personnel
 A Certain Ratio – production
 Phil Ault – engineering
 EG – mastering
 Steve McGarry – artwork
 Denis Ryan – artwork painting

Chart positions
Album

References

External links 

 

1982 albums
A Certain Ratio albums
Factory Records albums
New wave albums by English artists
Funk albums by English artists
Dance music albums by English artists